Elphas is a masculine given name of Southern African origin.

It may refer to:
 Elphas Buthelezi, South African politician
 Elphas Ginindza (born 1967), Swazi long-distance runner
 Elphas Mukonoweshuro (c. 1953 – 2011). Zimbabwean political scientist and politician
  Elphas Zakis (born 1996, Kenya)  Freelancer

See also 

 Elias
 Elphias

African masculine given names